The Madera AVA is an American Viticultural Area located in Fresno County and Madera County, in central California.

Production
Modern grape growing practices have shown that this region can produce very high quality wines. The  region has seen tremendous growth and success due to the shift from high-volume production to high-quality production.

Uses
In years past, many of the grapes grown in Madera were used for the production of low-priced wines. Today, the grapes are shipped to producers of wines throughout the state, including Napa and Sonoma. The wineries located in the region produce award-winning wines from the large variety of grapes grown in the Madera AVA designation.

References 

American Viticultural Areas
American Viticultural Areas of California
Geography of Fresno County, California
Geography of Madera County, California
San Joaquin Valley
1984 establishments in California